Guararé Arriba is a corregimiento in Guararé District, Los Santos Province, Panama with a population of 394 as of 2010. Its population as of 1990 was 361; its population as of 2000 was 378.

References

Corregimientos of Los Santos Province